Tiong Bahru MRT station is an underground Mass Rapid Transit (MRT) station on the East West line in Bukit Merah, Singapore. This is the first and last underground station for eastbound and westbound trains respectively.

Directly connected to Tiong Bahru Plaza, this station serves the residential precincts of Tiong Bahru and Bukit Ho Swee.

History

On 5 April 1985, construction of Tiong Bahru MRT station and tunnels from Outram Park to Redhill was awarded to Ong Chwee Kou-Boris SAE joint venture under Contract 201.

Tiong Bahru station opened on 12 March 1988, which is part of the Phase 1B of the MRT line. It travels from Outram Park to Clementi.

To commemorate Total Defence Day in 2000, the Singapore Civil Defence Force conducted the first ever Shelter Open House at this station on 15 and 16 February, together with Somerset and Lavender.

Before the HarbourFront MRT station opened in 2003 on the North East line, it was the nearest MRT station to Sentosa. Shuttle bus services linking Sentosa to Tiong Bahru MRT operated for several years until it was eventually withdrawn in 2004.

The station's upgrading, which included a new lift for the disabled, was completed on 29 December 2005.

References

External links
 

Railway stations in Singapore opened in 1988
Bukit Merah
Mass Rapid Transit (Singapore) stations